Nazm is a major part of Urdu and Sindhi  poetry that is normally written in rhymed verse and also in modern prose-style poems.  is a significant genre of Urdu and Sindhi poetry; the other one is known as ghazal.

 is significantly written by controlling one’s thoughts and feelings, which are constructively discussed as well as developed and finally, concluded, according to the poetic laws. The title of the  itself holds the central theme as a whole. While writing , it is not important to follow any rules as it depends on the writer. A  can be long or short and there are no restrictions on size or rhyme scheme. In summary,  is a form of descriptive poetry.

Forms of  
The following are the different forms of :

 Doha
 Geet
 Hamd
 Hijv
 Kafi
 Madah
 Manqabat 
 Marsia
 Masnavi
 Munajat
 Musaddas
 Mukhammas
 Naʽat
 Noha
 Qasida
 Qat'ã
 Qawwali
 Rubai (also called  or )
 Salaam
 Sehra
 Shehr a'ashob
 Soz
 Wasokht
 Tarana

Urdu  poets 
Notable  poets include:

 Nazeer Akbarabadi
 Majeed Amjad
 Syed Waheed Ashraf
 Kaifi Azmi
 Faiz Ahmad Faiz
 Ahmed Faraz
 Zia Fatehabadi
 Firaq Gorakhpuri
 Gulzar
 Altaf Hussain Hali
 Sir Allama Dr. Muhammad Iqbal
 Ali Sardar Jafri
 Hafeez Jalandhri
 Sahir Ludhianvi
 Josh Malihabadi
 Moeen Nizami
 Ahmed Nadeem Qasmi
 Noon Meem Rashid
 Ismail Merathi

References

Indian poetics
Urdu-language poetry
Pakistani poetics